Faouzi Rouissi (born 20 March 1971 in Tunis) is a Tunisian former professional footballer who played as a striker.

Rouissi's career started at the age of 10, when he joined local club Club Africain. He spent seven successful years in their youth academy before debuting as a senior in the 1988–89 season. During that season, he established himself as a regular and for the next four seasons that he played there he picked up two league titles, an African cup and an afro-Asian cup before leaving for French Ligue 2 side Stade Malherbe Caen.

Rouissi also had a spell with SpVgg Greuther Fürth in the 2. Bundesliga. He played in seven FIFA World Cup qualifying matches.

References

External links

1971 births
Living people
Tunisian footballers
Tunisian expatriate footballers
Tunisia international footballers
1994 African Cup of Nations players
1998 African Cup of Nations players
Club Africain players
Stade Malherbe Caen players
Al Hilal SFC players
SpVgg Greuther Fürth players
Al Wahda FC players
Tunisian Ligue Professionnelle 1 players
Ligue 1 players
Saudi Professional League players
2. Bundesliga players
UAE Pro League players
Association football forwards
Expatriate footballers in France
Expatriate footballers in Saudi Arabia
Expatriate footballers in Germany
Expatriate footballers in the United Arab Emirates
Tunisian expatriate sportspeople in France
Tunisian expatriate sportspeople in Saudi Arabia
Tunisian expatriate sportspeople in Germany
Tunisian expatriate sportspeople in the United Arab Emirates
US Ben Guerdane managers
Tunisian football managers